Scylla or Scyllae was a town of ancient Thrace, on the Euxine, where the long wall, erected by the emperor Anastasius I Dicorus for the defence of Constantinople, terminated.

Its site is located near Podima, Yalıköy in European Turkey.

References

Populated places in ancient Thrace
Former populated places in Turkey
History of Kırklareli Province